Mischievous Susana (Spanish: La pícara Susana) is a 1945 Mexican musical comedy film directed by Fernando Cortés and starring Mapy Cortés, Luis Aldás, Fortunio Bonanova and Fernando Cortés.

Cast
 Mapy Cortés as Susana Martínez/ Lupe Rodríguez
 Luis Aldás as Miguel Ángel Pérez  
Fortunio Bonanova as Conde Mauricio Tonescu  
 Fernando Cortés as Don Andrés Martínez Rico 
 Alfredo Varela as Señor Badu 
 Luis G. Barreiro as Sr. Ramón Filosel  
 Virginia Manzano as Margarita  
 José Pidal as Benjamín, butler
 Conchita Gentil Arcos as customer
 Consuelo Segarra as Sra. Pérez  
 Paco Martínez as Sr. Pérez  
 Pedro Elviro as waiter
 Fernando Del Valle 
 José Arratia 
 Jose Pastor 
 Alfredo Varela padre as waiter
 Lidia Franco as homeowner
 Ana María Hernández as dinner guest
 Margarito Luna as drunk
 Félix Samper as dinner guest
 María Valdealde as Mujer transeúnte

References

Bibliography 
 Miluka Rivera. Legado puertorriqueño en Hollywood: famosos y olvidados. Lulu.com, 2010.

External links 
 

1945 films
1945 musical comedy films
Mexican musical comedy films
1940s Spanish-language films
Films directed by Fernando Cortés
Mexican black-and-white films
Mexican films based on plays
Films based on works by Louis Verneuil
1940s Mexican films